Sawai (also known as Öt-ka-sip) is a village in the Nicobar district of Andaman and Nicobar Islands, India. It is located in the Car Nicobar tehsil.

Demographics 

According to the 2011 census of India, Sawai has 286 households. The effective literacy rate (i.e. the literacy rate of population excluding children aged 6 and below) is 86.23%.

References 

Villages in Car Nicobar tehsil